Myint Kan (born 13 September 1965) is a Burmese long-distance runner. He competed in the marathon at the 1992 Summer Olympics.

References

External links
 

1965 births
Living people
Athletes (track and field) at the 1992 Summer Olympics
Burmese male long-distance runners
Burmese male marathon runners
Olympic athletes of Myanmar
Place of birth missing (living people)